Dytiscus caraboides is a species of beetle from the family Dytiscidae. The scientific name of this genus was first published in 1758 by Linnaeus.

References

Dytiscidae
Beetles described in 1758
Taxa named by Carl Linnaeus